Philip Esmond Durrell Pank (22 April 1892 – 15 February 1966) was an Indian born English cricketer. A left-arm orthodox spin bowler, he played first-class cricket in India in 1918 and in England in 1925 and played four times for the Egypt national cricket team.

Biography

Born in Jaypore in 1892, Philip Pank made his first-class debut playing for the Europeans in the Bombay Quadrangular tournament in September 1918. He played a match for England against India later in the year.

He played one first-class match during the 1925 English cricket season, playing for the British Army cricket team against Oxford University in June. He later played for Egypt, playing twice against the Free Foresters in 1927 and twice against HM Martineau's XI in 1931. He died in Colchester in 1966.

References

1892 births
1966 deaths
Cricketers from Jaipur
Egyptian cricketers
English cricketers
British Army cricketers
Europeans cricketers
British people in colonial India